Thomas May  (c. 1604–1655) was an English politician who sat in the House of Commons from 1640 to 1642. He supported the Royalist cause in the English Civil War.

May, of Rawmere, in Mid Lavant, Sussex, was a nephew of Sir Humphrey May and grandson of Richard May  rich Merchant Taylor of London.  

In April 1640, May was elected Member of Parliament for Midhurst in the Short Parliament. He was re-elected MP for Midhurst for the Long Parliament in November 1640. His estates were subsequently sequestered and restored when he paid a fine of £900 for his delinquency in February 1647.

References

1600s births
1655 deaths
People from Midhurst
Year of birth uncertain
English MPs 1640 (April)
English MPs 1640–1648
Cavaliers